Picturenation was a British-based online stock image library providing royalty-free images to the editorial, commercial and education sectors.

History 

Picturenation was set up in 2006 by Jane Green, a former BBC journalist, TV news director and web producer. The company was based at Staffordshire University in Stoke-on-Trent, UK, and the University was a shareholder in the company. As of August 2009 the company stocked over 96,000 checked images from over 9,800 photographers.

Picturenation was a totally web-based operation, and the website closed permanently on 17 August 2013.

External links 
 Picturenation

Stock photography